Kang Ji-seok (born 24 August 1994) is a South Korean male swimmer. He is also a South Korean national record holder in 50m backstroke event.

He claimed a bronze medal in the men's 50m backstroke event at the 2018 Asian Games representing South Korea.

References 

1994 births
Living people
South Korean male backstroke swimmers
Swimmers at the 2018 Asian Games
Medalists at the 2018 Asian Games
Asian Games bronze medalists for South Korea
Asian Games medalists in swimming
Sportspeople from North Jeolla Province
21st-century South Korean people